Zarza-Capilla is a Spanish municipality in the province of Badajoz, Extremadura. According to the 2014 census, the municipality has a population of 363 inhabitants.

References

External links

Official website 
Profile 

Municipalities in the Province of Badajoz